Qiu Aihua (born 28 January 1977) is a Chinese former volleyball player who competed in the 2000 Summer Olympic.

References

Chinese women's volleyball players
Sportspeople from Jiangsu
Volleyball players from Jiangsu
Olympic volleyball players of China
Volleyball players at the 2000 Summer Olympics
Asian Games medalists in volleyball
Volleyball players at the 1998 Asian Games
Medalists at the 1998 Asian Games
Asian Games gold medalists for China
1977 births
Living people
20th-century Chinese women